Cheongmyeong Station is a subway station of the Bundang Line, the commuter subway line of Korail, the national railway of South Korea. The station was opened in December 2012 as part of the latest southward extension of the Bundang Line. 

The station is located at 1055 Yeongtong-dong, Yeongtong-gu, Suwon-si, Gyeonggi-do and serves Yeongtong-dong and Yeongtong-gu. It has two side platforms with two tracks running between them and is located underground at an approximate depth of 28 meters. It also serves as an important transportation hub connecting to Wangsimni or Cheongnyangni Stations on Seoul Subway Lines 2 & 5 respectively. 

The station features a number of amenities including ticket vending machines, elevators, escalators and restrooms. It also provides transfer access to bus routes and multiple intercity buses as well as bike rental services. Additionally, there are various shops located within the premises that offer food and beverages for commuters. Cheongmyeong Station is open 24 hours a day, 7 days a week allowing passengers to travel conveniently without any time restrictions. 

The station's name derives from its native Korean name 청명 (Cheonmgyeo) which literally means "clear brightness". In hanja script it is written 淸明驛 meaning "clear bright station".

References

Seoul Metropolitan Subway stations
Railway stations opened in 2012
Metro stations in Suwon